Edward Linskens (born 6 November 1968) is a Dutch retired footballer who played as a defensive midfielder, mainly for PSV.

Football career
Linskens was born in Venray, Limburg. During his 11-year professional career he played for PSV Eindhoven, NAC Breda, K.S.C. Lokeren Oost-Vlaanderen (Belgium) and VVV-Venlo, the latter club competing in the second division.

At PSV, Linskens was an important first-team element and helped it to the European Cup victory in 1988, playing the entire final against S.L. Benfica of Portugal, won on penalties. With the Eindhoven side, he appeared in more than 150 official matches and scored more than 20 goals.

References

External links
Stats at Voetbal International 
Elf Voetbal profile 

1968 births
Living people
People from Venray
Dutch footballers
Association football midfielders
Eredivisie players
Eerste Divisie players
PSV Eindhoven players
NAC Breda players
VVV-Venlo players
Belgian Pro League players
K.S.C. Lokeren Oost-Vlaanderen players
Dutch expatriate footballers
Expatriate footballers in Belgium
Footballers from Limburg (Netherlands)
Dutch expatriate sportspeople in Belgium